Ngada Regency is one of the regencies on the island of Flores, East Nusa Tenggara Province, Indonesia. It is bordered by East Manggarai Regency to the west and Nagekeo Regency to the east, with the Flores Sea to the north and the Sawu Sea to the south. The Regency, which covers an area of 1,620.92 km2, had a population of 142,254 at the 2010 census, which increased to 165,254 at the 2020 census; the official estimate as at mid 2021 was 167,396. The town of Bajawa is the capital of Ngada Regency.

History

The Ngada Regency is one of the older regencies (kabupaten) in East Nusa Tenggara, having been formed in 1958.  The regency was split into two on 2 January 2007, with the eastern part being formed into a new Nagekeo Regency. With the separate of Nagekeo, the residual Ngada now only has two main ethnic groups, the Bajawa in the south and the Riung in the north.

As is the case with other regencies across Indonesia, local events sometimes seize the headlines.  For example, in December 2013 a row broke out when the Ngada Regency head (bupati), Marianus Sae, apparently became angered following an altercation over local travel arrangements.  On Saturday 21 December 2013 Marianus Sae was apparently unable to obtain a seat on a local flight in East Nusa Tenggara.  Angered by the situation, Sae is reported to have ordered his subordinates to blockade the runway of the Turelelo airport in Soa District (kecamatan).  The incident attracted national attention leading to a formal investigation of Sae's actions.

Administrative Districts 
The Ngada Regency as at 2010 was divided into nine districts (kecamatan), but since 2010 three additional districts have been created by splitting of existing districts - Inerie, Golewa Selatan (South Golewa) and Golewa Barat (West Golewa). The districts are tabulated below with their areas and their populations at the 2010 census and the 2020 census, together with the official estimates as at mid 2021. The table also includes the administrative centres and the number of administrative villages in each district (totalling 135 rural desa and 16 urban kelurahan), and its postal codes.

Notes: (a) including 2 kelurahan. (b) the 2010 population of the new Inerie District is included with the figures for Aimere and Jerebuu Districts. (c) including 9 kelurahan. (d) the 2010 populations of the new Golewa Selatan and Golewa Barat Districts are included with the figure for Golewa District. (e) including 1 kelurahan. (f) the Riung District includes 26 small offshore islands.

Language
The principal language in Ngada is Ngadha, but there are several indigenous languages in Ngada based on their ethnicity. People from Aimere, Bajawa, Golewa, Inerie and Jerebu'u might speak the same language with minor differences, while people from Soa speak a slightly different language, and people from Riung speak a totally different language. Unable to communicate each others, they use Indonesian.

Tourism

Ngada Regency is one of the poorest regions in Indonesia but there is increasing in popularity among international tourists which is providing some help to the local economy.

The two most visited areas in the Ngada region are Bena and Wogo, both unique megalithic complexes with traditional housing. To Ngadha society, the traditional houses occupy an important role as organizational units, as villagers must each belong to a house, thereby a clan.  Clan totems can be ornately crafted symbols of this social organization.
In the north part, Riung, Ngada offers a beautiful beaches and islands called 17 island of Riung. The islands give the opportunity for the tourists to do snorkeling, diving, sun bathing, and witnessing flying foxes.

Culture
The megalithic sites in the Ngada region were added to the UNESCO World Heritage Tentative List on October 19, 1995, in the Cultural category. But was pulled out from the list on 2015.

Soa Valley
In 1968 stegodon fossil and stone artefacts were found in the Soa Valley north of Bajawa. In 1991 excavations were carried out but no significant discoveries were found. In excavations in 1994 researchers found 12 sites of artefacts and the fossils. The age of the Soa Valley is put at around 650,000 to 1.02 million years during which time there were at least two devastating volcanic events.  So far, researchers have not found human fossils but it is believed that human fossils may yet be found. Stone artefacts suggesting hominin activity have been found in caves such as Mata Menge in the area. If human fossils are indeed found, this may contribute to knowledge about migration into eastern Indonesia.  Research at nearby Liang Bua cave to the west near Ruteng has also contributed to expanding knowledge about early human activity in the area.

References

External links
Ngada traditional house and megalithic complex - UNESCO World Heritage Centre Accessed 2009-02-27.
Phillimore, J. & Lisa Goodson (2004), Qualitative Research in Tourism: Ontologies, Epistemologies and Methodologies, Routledge, 2004. 

World Heritage Sites in Indonesia
Flores Island (Indonesia)
Regencies of East Nusa Tenggara